Edward Arthur Aylmer  (20 March 1892 – 30 October 1974) was an English first-class cricketer and Royal Navy officer. He served in the Royal Navy from 1911–1945, seeing action in both the First World War and the Second World War. Reaching the rank of captain, he commanded several ships and establishments during his career. He also played first-class cricket for the Royal Navy Cricket Club.

Life and naval career
Alymer was born at Falmouth to Frederick Arthur Aylmer and his wife, Constance Isabella Grenfell. Having been made an acting sub-lieutenant in September 1912, he was promoted to the full rank in May 1913. He served with the Royal Navy during the First World War, with promotion to the rank of lieutenant in December 1914. He was awarded the Distinguished Service Cross in June 1917.

He made a single appearance in first-class cricket for the Royal Navy against Cambridge University at Fenner's in 1920. Batting twice in the match, he was dismissed by Charles Marriott for 10 runs in the Royal Navy first-innings, while in their second-innings he was unbeaten on 10. He took a single wicket in the Cambridge University first-innings, when he dismissed Jack MacBryan to finish with innings figures of 1 for 19, though he went wicketless in their second-innings. He was promoted to the rank of lieutenant commander in December 1922, and was given his first command when he was placed in command of the submarine . He was promoted to the rank of commander in June 1927.

Later naval career and life
From 1933 to 1935, he was the commanding officer aboard  and commanded the 6th Submarine Flotilla. He was promoted to the rank of captain in June 1935. He was present at the Royal Naval College from March–July 1936, before commanding ,  and the 1st Submarine Flotilla from July 1936 to June 1938. From August 1940 to February 1942, he commanded . While commanding HMS Newcastle he escorted George II of Greece to exile in Britain. He was mentioned in dispatches in January 1942, and was made a recipient of the Order of George I for his role in escorting George II to exile. From April 1942 to August 1943, he was the commanding officer of the Royal Naval College, Eaton. He retired from active service soon after.

He died in October 1974 at Askerwell, Dorset. His wife, Gladwys Phoebe Evans, predeceased him by six years. Their only son, Gerald Aylmer, was a historian of 17th century England.

References

External links

Royal Navy Officers 1939−1945

1892 births
1974 deaths
People from Falmouth, Cornwall
Royal Navy officers
Royal Navy officers of World War I
Recipients of the Distinguished Service Cross (United Kingdom)
English cricketers
Royal Navy cricketers
Royal Navy officers of World War II
Recipients of the Order of George I
Military personnel from Cornwall